Serhiy Sitalo (born 20 December 1986 in Magadan, Russian SFSR, Soviet Union) is a professional Ukrainian football goalkeeper who plays for Kolos Kovalivka.

Career
Sitalo is a product of the youth team systems of LVUFK Luhansk and FC Dnipro Dnipropetrovsk. He signed a contract with SC Tavriya in March 2011.

Desna Chernigiv
In 2014 he moved to Desna Chernihiv the club in the city of Chernihiv.

Honours
Arsenal Kyiv
 Ukrainian First League: 2017–18

References

External links

1986 births
People from Magadan
Living people
Russian emigrants to Ukraine
Ukrainian footballers
Association football goalkeepers
FC Dnipro-2 Dnipropetrovsk players
FC Stal Kamianske players
FC Shakhtar Sverdlovsk players
FC Stal Alchevsk players
SC Tavriya Simferopol players
Ukrainian Premier League players
FC Desna Chernihiv players
FC Arsenal Kyiv players
FC Kolos Kovalivka players